Each year the North Dakota Mr. Basketball award is given to the person chosen as the best high school boys basketball senior player in the U.S. state of North Dakota.

The award has been given since 1985. Winners are chosen by the North Dakota Associated Press Sportscasters and Sportswriters Association (NDAPSSA). As of 2022, there has been a total of 17 class B winners to 24 class A.

Award winners

Schools with multiple winners

Universities with multiple winners

See also
North Dakota Miss Basketball

References 

Mr. Basketball
Mr. and Miss Basketball awards
Awards established in 1985
1985 establishments in North Dakota
Mr. Basketball
Mr. Basketball